The Rivière des Monts (English: River of the Mounts) is a tributary of the southwest bank of the lower part of the watercourse Le Gros Bras, flowing in the non organized from Lac-Pikauba and the municipality of Saint-Urbain, in the Charlevoix Regional County Municipality, in the administrative region of Capitale-Nationale, in the province of Quebec, in Canada.

The lower part of this valley is mainly served by a few forest roads which connect to the north with the Parc-des-Grands-Jardins road. The upper part of this valley is served by a few other forest roads which also serve Lac Chambers and Lac Carbonel to the south. Forestry is the main economic activity in this valley; recreational tourism, second.

The surface of the lower part of Le Petit Bras is generally frozen from the beginning of December until the beginning of April; however, safe circulation on the ice is generally done from mid-December to the end of March. The upper part of this stream has a freezing period of about an additional week. The water level of the river varies with the seasons and the precipitation; the spring flood generally occurs in April.

Geography 
The Rivière des Monts rises at the mouth of a small lake located in a forest area in a valley between Lac Saint-Denys (located on the north side) and the Thomas-Fortin Lake (located on the southwest side). This source of the river is located at:
  east of the limit of Lac-Pikauba and Saint-Urbain;
  east of the course of the upper part of the Malbaie River;
  north-west of the village center of Saint-Urbain;
  north-west of the mouth of Le Gros Bras (confluence with the Gouffre river);
  north-west of Baie-Saint-Paul town center.

  first towards the south-east in a plain, then towards the north-east in an increasingly deep valley, until the discharge (coming from the south-west) from Lac Michel and Plaisant Pond;
  east in a deep valley, to the outlet (coming from the northwest) from Lac à Moïse;
  north-east to a bend in the river; then south-east in a deep valley, to a stream (coming from the south-west);
  towards the east, passing on the north side of Mont du Gros Ruisseau, to its mouth.

The Rivière des Monts flows on the southwest bank of the Le Gros Bras stream, in the municipality of Saint-Urbain. This mouth is located at:
  southwest of route 381;
  south-west of Lac des Cygnes;
  north-west of the village center of Saint-Urbain;
  west of the village center of Saint-Hilarion;
  north-west of Baie-Saint-Paul town center.

Toponymy 
This toponymic designation appears on a 1996 map.

The toponym “Rivière des Monts” was formalized on March 25, 1997 at the Place Names Bank of the Commission de toponymie du Québec.

Notes and references

Appendices

Related articles 
 Charlevoix Regional County Municipality
 Lac-Pikauba, an unorganized territory
 Saint-Urbain, a municipality
 Bras Nord de la rivière des Monts
 Le Gros Bras (Gouffre River tributary)
 Rivière du Gouffre
 St. Lawrence River
 List of rivers of Quebec

External links 

Rivers of Capitale-Nationale
Charlevoix Regional County Municipality